Sir William Congreve, 2nd Baronet KCH FRS (20 May 1772 – 16 May 1828) was an English soldier, publisher and inventor. He pioneered rocket artillery and was renowned for his development and deployment of Congreve rockets. He was also a Tory Member of Parliament (MP).

Biography
He was the eldest son of Rebeca Elmston and Lt. General Sir William Congreve, 1st Baronet, the Comptroller of the Royal Laboratories at the Royal Arsenal and raised in Kent, England. He was educated at Newcome's school in Hackney, Wolverhampton Grammar School and Singlewell School in Kent. He then studied law at Trinity College, Cambridge, graduating BA in 1793 and MA in 1796. In 1814 he succeeded his father as second Baronet Congreve.

In 1803 he was a volunteer in the London and Westminster Light Horse, and was a London businessman who published a polemical newspaper, the Royal Standard and Political Register, which was Tory, pro-government and anti-Cobbett. Following a damaging libel action against it in 1804, Congreve withdrew from publishing and applied himself to inventing. Many years previously, several unsuccessful experiments had been made at the Royal Laboratory in Woolwich by Lt. General Thomas Desaguliers. In 1804, at his own expense, he began experimenting with rockets at Woolwich. Congreve was named as comptroller of the Royal Laboratory at Woolwich from 1814 until his death. (Congreve's father had also held the same post.)

Congreve was awarded the honorary rank of lieutenant colonel in the Hanoverian army's artillery in 1811, and was often referred to as "Colonel Congreve", later made major general in the same army. He was elected a Fellow of the Royal Society in March that year.  He was also awarded the Order of St. George following the Battle of Leipzig in 1813 and 1816 he was made Knight Commander of the Royal Guelphic Order (KCH). In 1821 he was awarded the Order of the Sword by the King of Sweden.

He enjoyed the friendship of the Prince Regent, in whose household he served as an equerry from 1811, carrying on the service when the Prince, who supported his rocket projects, became King George IV in 1820.

Earlier in 1812 he offered to contest for Parliament the borough of Liverpool but withdrew before polling for lack of support. He entered Parliament later that year when he was nominated as MP for the rotten borough of Gatton in 1812, but withdrew at the next elections in 1814 in favour of the son of the borough's proprietor Sir Mark Wood. In 1818 he was returned as Member for Plymouth, a seat he held until his death.

After living with a mistress and fathering two illegitimate sons, he married in December 1824, at Wessel, Prussia, Isabella Carvalho (or Charlotte), a young woman of Portuguese descent and widow of Henry Nisbett McEvoy. They had two sons and a daughter.

In 1824 he became general manager of the English Association for Gas Lighting on the Continent, a sizeable business producing gas for several cities in mainland Europe, including Berlin.

In later years he became a businessman and was chairman of the Equitable Loan Bank, director of the Arigna Iron and Coal Company, the Palladium Insurance Company and the Peruvian Mining Company. After a major fraud case began against him in 1826 in connection with the Arigna company, he fled to France, where he was taken seriously ill. He was prosecuted in his absence, the Lord Chancellor ultimately ruling, just before Congreve's death, that the transaction was "clearly fraudulent" and designed to profit Congreve and others.

He died in Toulouse, France, in May 1828, aged 55, and was buried there in the Protestant and Jewish cemetery of Chemin du Béarnais.

Congreve's name was used for a kind of friction match, "Congreaves", though he was not involved in their invention or production.

Congreve Rockets

Mysorean rockets were the first iron-cased rockets that were successfully deployed for military use. Hyder Ali, the 18th century ruler of Mysore and his son and successor Tipu Sultan used them against the forces of the East India Company during the Anglo-Mysore Wars, beginning in 1780 with the Battle of Pollilur. In battles at Seringapatam in 1792 and 1799 these rockets were used with minimal effect against the British.

The experiences of the British with Mysorean rockets, mentioned in Munro's book of 1789, eventually led to the Royal Arsenal beginning a military rocket R&D program in 1801. Several rocket cases were collected from Mysore and sent to Britain for analysis. The development was chiefly the work of William Congreve, who set up a research and development programme at the Woolwich Arsenal's laboratory. After development work was complete the rockets were manufactured in quantity further north, near Waltham Abbey, Essex. He was told that "the British at Seringapatam had suffered more from the rockets than from the shells or any other weapon used by the enemy." "In at least one instance", an eyewitness told Congreve, "a single rocket had killed three men and badly wounded others."

It has been suggested that Congreve may have adapted iron-cased gunpowder rockets for use by the British military from prototypes created by the Irish nationalist Robert Emmet during Emmet's Rebellion in 1803. But this seems far less likely given the fact that the British had been exposed to Indian rockets since 1780 at the latest, and that a vast quantity of unused rockets and their construction equipment fell into British hands at the end of the Anglo-Mysore Wars in 1799, 4 years before Emmet's rockets.

Congreve first demonstrated solid fuel rockets at the Royal Arsenal in 1805. He considered his work sufficiently advanced to engage in two Royal Navy attacks on the French fleet at Boulogne, France, one that year and one the next. In 1807 Congreve and sixteen Ordnance Department civilian employees were present at the Bombardment of Copenhagen, during which 300 rockets contributed to the conflagration of the city.

Congreve rockets were successfully used for the remainder of the Napoleonic Wars, with the most important employment of the weapon being at the Battle of Leipzig in 1813. The "rockets' red glare" in the American national anthem describes their firing at Fort McHenry during the War of 1812. In January 1814 the Royal Artillery absorbed the various companies armed with rockets into two Rocket Troops within the Royal Horse Artillery. They remained in the arsenal of the United Kingdom until the 1850s. Congreve organized the impressive firework displays in London for the peace of 1814 and for the coronation of George IV in 1821.

Other inventions
Besides his rockets, Congreve was a prolific (if indifferently successful) inventor for the remainder of his life. He registered 18 patents, of which 2 were for rockets. Congreve invented a gun-recoil mounting, a time-fuze, a rocket parachute attachment, a hydropneumatic canal lock (installed at Hampstead Road Lock, north London) and sluice (1813), a perpetual motion machine, a process of colour printing (1821) which was widely used in Germany, a new form of steam engine, and a method of consuming smoke (which was applied at the Royal Laboratory). He also took out patents for a clock in which time was measured by a ball rolling along a zig-zag track on an inclined plane; for protecting buildings against fire; inlaying and combining metals; unforgeable bank note paper; a method of killing whales by means of rockets; improvements in the manufacture of gunpowder; stereotype plates; fireworks; and gas meters.

Congreve's unsuccessful perpetual motion scheme involved an endless band which should raise more water by its capillary action on one side than on the other. He used capillary action of fluids that would disobey the law of never rising above their own level, so to produce a continual ascent and overflow. The device had an inclined plane over pulleys. At the top and bottom, there travelled an endless band of sponge, a bed, and, over this, again an endless band of heavy weights jointed together. The whole stood over the surface of still water. The capillary action raised the water, whereas the same thing could not happen in the part, since the weights would squeeze the water out. Hence, it was heavier than the other; but as "we know that if it were the same weight, there would be equilibrium, if the heavy chain be also uniform". Therefore, the extra weight of it would cause the chain to move round in the direction of the arrow, and this would go on, supposedly, continually.

Publications

A Concise account of the origin and progress of the rocket system (1804) 
A Concise Account of the Origin and Progress of the Rocket System (1807)  
The details of the rocket system (1814)
The Congreve Rocket System (1827, London) 
An Elementary Treatise on the Mounting of Naval Ordnance (1812) 
A Description of the Hydropneumatical Lock (1815)
A New Principle of Steam-Engine (1819)
Resumption of Cash Payments (1819) 

Systems of Currency (1819)

See also
Waltham Abbey Royal Gunpowder Mills

Notes

References
 
 James Earle "Commodore Squib: The Life, Times and Secretive Wars of England's First Rocket Man, Sir William Congreve, 1772–1828" (Cambridge Scholars Publishing, 2010), 270p., illus. 
 Frank H. Winter The First Golden Age of Rocketry (Washington and London: Smithsonian Institution Press, 1990), 322p., illus.

External links

Royal Artillery of the Napoleonic Wars

1772 births
1828 deaths
People from Kent
Alumni of Trinity College, Cambridge
British Army personnel of the Napoleonic Wars
Baronets in the Baronetage of the United Kingdom
English inventors
Early rocketry
Rocket scientists
Members of the Parliament of the United Kingdom for Plymouth
UK MPs 1818–1820
UK MPs 1820–1826
UK MPs 1826–1830
Fellows of the Royal Society
People educated at Wolverhampton Grammar School
People educated at Newcome's School